Guilherme Antonio Arana Lopes (born 14 April 1997), known as Guilherme Arana, is a Brazilian professional footballer who plays as a left back for Atlético Mineiro and the Brazil national team.

Club career

Early career
Born in São Paulo, Arana was a part of Corinthians youth squads for many years, being considered one of the top prospects of the club. He won the 2014 U20 Campeonato Paulista, 2014 U20 Campeonato Brasileiro and 2015 Copa São Paulo de Futebol Júnior, also being a runner-up at the 2014 edition.

Corinthians
Arana was promoted to Corinthians' main squad after the 2014 Copa São Paulo de Futebol Júnior final and was an unused substitute in twelve matches of the 2014 Campeonato Brasileiro Série A.

Arana was part of the main squad for the 2015 Campeonato Paulista and 2015 Copa Libertadores.

Athlético Paranaense (loan)
Arana was loaned to Atlético Paranaense on 7 May 2015 for the remaining of the year as part of the squad for the 2015 Campeonato Brasileiro Série A. He made his professional debut as a substitute against Atlético Mineiro on 24 May. He was called back by Corinthians on 26 June.

Breakthrough
On 12 August 2015, Arana made his Corinthians debut as a substitute during half-time in a 4–3 win against Sport Recife at Arena Corinthians. He was directly responsible for the second goal of Sport, as he made a wrong pass that was intercepted and resulted in a goal. He compensated for the mistake by creating the opportunity that resulted in a penalty kick, which gave Corinthians the victory. He made his first league start in the away game against Avaí on 16 August. On 6 September, Arana scored his first goal in a 3–3 away draw against Corinthians' biggest rival Palmeiras.

Sevilla
On 7 December 2017, Arana transferred to Spanish club Sevilla on a deal worth 12 million euros and signed a four-and-a-half year contract. He joined the squad upon the opening of the winter transfer window in January 2018.

Atalanta (loan)
On 28 August 2019, Arana joined Italian club Atalanta on a season-long loan with the option to buy.

Atlético Mineiro
On 29 January 2020, Arana joined Atlético Mineiro on an 18-month loan deal, which included an obligatory purchase clause.

International career
Arana represented Brazil at the 2017 South American U-20 Championship. Arana also represented the under-23 team in 2019, playing in friendlies against South American rivals Chile and Colombia, ahead of the CONMEBOL Olympic Qualifying Championship (in which he did not take part) and the Summer Olympics originally scheduled for 2020, now being held in 2021.

On 14 November 2020, Arana received his first call-up to the full national team ahead of a 2022 World Cup qualifier against Uruguay; he was picked as an emergency replacement for Alex Telles, who had withdrawn from the squad after being diagnosed with COVID-19.

On 17 June 2021, Arana was named in the Brazil squad for the 2020 Summer Olympics.

He made his debut for the senior team on 7 October 2021 in a World Cup qualifier against Venezuela.

Career statistics

Club

International

Honours

Club
Corinthians
Campeonato Brasileiro Série A: 2015, 2017
Campeonato Paulista: 2017

Atlético Mineiro
Campeonato Mineiro: 2020, 2021, 2022
Campeonato Brasileiro Série A: 2021
Copa do Brasil: 2021
Supercopa do Brasil: 2022

International
Brazil Olympic
Summer Olympics: 2020

Individual
Copa Libertadores Team of the Tournament: 2021
Campeonato Brasileiro Team of the Year: 2017, 2020, 2021
Campeonato Paulista Team of the Year: 2017
Bola de Prata: 2020, 2021
Campeonato Mineiro Team of the Year: 2020, 2021, 2022
South American Team of the Year: 2021

References

1997 births
Living people
Footballers from São Paulo
Brazilian footballers
Association football defenders
Sport Club Corinthians Paulista players
Club Athletico Paranaense players
Sevilla FC players
Atalanta B.C. players
Clube Atlético Mineiro players
Campeonato Brasileiro Série A players
La Liga players
Serie A players
Brazilian expatriate footballers
Brazilian expatriate sportspeople in Spain
Expatriate footballers in Spain
Brazilian expatriate sportspeople in Italy
Expatriate footballers in Italy
Brazil under-20 international footballers
Olympic footballers of Brazil
Footballers at the 2020 Summer Olympics
Olympic medalists in football
Olympic gold medalists for Brazil
Medalists at the 2020 Summer Olympics
Brazil international footballers